

The Stampe et Vertongen RSV.28/180 Type III, also known as the RSV.28-PSV  (for pilotage sans visibilité, French for blind flying) was a military trainer aircraft built in Belgium to teach instrument-flying techniques.

Stampe et Vertongen's response was a conventional design, a two-seat biplane fitted with a hood that could be closed over the pilot to remove visibility. Because the student pilots were also to learn to land with instruments only, the fixed undercarriage was very sturdy and had a wide track. Only one example was built, but development continued with the Stampe et Vertongen ST-26 in 1932.

Specifications

Notes

References
 
 
 
 

1920s Belgian military trainer aircraft
Stampe et Vertongen aircraft
Single-engined tractor aircraft
Biplanes
Aircraft first flown in 1929